Roman Nikolayevich Baskov (born 1 April 1978) is a former Russian professional football player and coach.

Club career
He played 7 seasons in the Russian Football National League for 4 different clubs.

References

External links
 

1978 births
People from Volzhsky, Volgograd Oblast
Living people
Russian footballers
Association football midfielders
FC Energiya Volzhsky players
FC Tekstilshchik Kamyshin players
FC KAMAZ Naberezhnye Chelny players
FC Lada-Tolyatti players
FC Orenburg players
FC Khimik Dzerzhinsk players
Russian football managers
FC Nosta Novotroitsk players
FC Volga Ulyanovsk players
Sportspeople from Volgograd Oblast